Talsi is a Latvian Floorball League team based in Talsi, Latvia.

Goaltenders
  1  Andris Eglītis
12  Māris Ronis
41  Kārlis Švampe

Defencemen
  2  Oskars Fīrmanis
  7  Rihards Fīrmanis
11  Mikus Norde
14  Jānis Klestrovs
16  Andris Blumbahs
14  Ivo Solomahins
78  Mārtiņš Maķevics
81  Dailis Skudritis
84  Andris Jurkevics
91  Madars Plepis

Forwards
  4  Roberts Fārenhorsts
  8  Uvis Nordeja
  9  Andis Švalkovskis
10  Māris Āboltiņš
13  Daneks Balodis
17  Aivars Haselbaums
18  Kristiāns Lisovskis
20  Ģirts Zanders
21  Artis Raitums
69  Māris Kumerdanks

Talsi
Floorball in Latvia
Latvian floorball teams